The 1998 Tour de France was the 85th edition of Tour de France, one of cycling's Grand Tours. The Tour began in Dublin, Ireland with a prologue individual time trial on 11 July and Stage 11 occurred on 22 July with a mountainous stage to Plateau de Beille. The race finished on the Champs-Élysées in Paris on 2 August.

Prologue
11 July 1998 — Dublin,  (ITT)

The 1998 race commenced in the Irish capital of Dublin. Prior to the prologue, the Tour was already in uproar, as Festina masseur Willy Voet was found at the Belgian border carrying in his car performance-enhancing drugs. The team nonetheless started the race, placing three riders in the top ten.
The prologue was won by favorite Chris Boardman, 4 seconds in front of Abraham Olano. Previous year's winner Jan Ullrich came in sixth, just 5 seconds behind Boardman.

Stage 1
12 July 1998 — Dublin to Dublin, 

The windy and rainy first stage included the Cat. 3 climb of Wicklow Gap after 111 km. Tom Steels took his first ever stage win.

Stage 2
13 July 1998 — Enniscorthy to Cork, 

For stage 2, the Tour stayed in Ireland. Chris Boardman lost the jellow jersey after crashing some 50 km before the finish. He had to withdraw from the race. The race paid homage to Sean Kelly, passing his home village of Carrick-on-Suir. The stage was won in a mass sprint by Ján Svorada, with Erik Zabel taking yellow.

Stage 3
14 July 1998 — Roscoff to Lorient, 

For Bastille Day, the Tour returned to its homeland. The race was dominated by a 9-man breakaway, including three Frenchmen. The hopes of the French fans were spoiled by Team Telekom's Jens Heppner, taking the stage in a sprint finish over Xavier Jan. Heppner's win saved Telekom's day, as Erik Zabel lost the maillot jaune to Bo Hamburger.

Stage 4
15 July 1998 — Plouay – Cholet, 

The longest stage of the 1998 Tour led the riders over 252 km. Over the course there was a heavy "war for the bonuses" at the three intermediate sprints, with Stuart O'Grady coming out as the winner and taking the yellow jersey, the first Australian to do so for 16 years.

Stage 5
16 July 1998 — Cholet to Châteauroux, 

Before stage 5, Festina's team manager Bruno Roussel was suspended and taken in for police questioning. The team nevertheless started the stage. The peloton rode through Brittany in heavy rain which prevented attacks from being successful.

Stage 6
17 July 1998 — La Châtre to Brive-la-Gaillarde, 

Stage 6 was marked by many attacks, but none proved to be successful. In the end, Mario Cipollini took his second consecutive stage win.

Stage 7
18 July 1998 — Meyrignac-l'Église to Corrèze,  (Individual time trial)

On the morning before stage 7, the first long time trial, turmoil hit the Tour. After its manager had confessed to doping practices in Team Festina, the team was pulled from the race. Initially, the team refused to accept and declared its intention to race, but later left the Tour in disgrace. Tour favorite and French hero Richard Virenque was seen on TV stating his innocence, shaken by tears.
On the road, Jan Ullrich lived up to his reputation as an excellent time trialist and took the stage, an impressive 70 seconds in front of Tyler Hamilton. He also took the yellow jersey.

Stage 8
19 July 1998 — Brive-la-Gaillarde to Montauban, 

Six climbs of lower categories were on this stage's profile, making it perfect for strong breakaway groups. The stage was won by breakaway king Jacky Durand, getting the best from a 6-rider sprint finish.

Stage 9
20 July 1998 — Montauban to Pau, 

Léon van Bon won his second Tour stage, beating Jens Voigt in a sprint finish, with the peloton rapidly approaching.

Stage 10
21 July 1998 — Pau to Luchon, 

The Tour entered the mountains on stage 10. On the program were the two H.C. climbs of Col d'Aubisque and Col du Tourmalet and the 1st category climbs of Col d'Aspin and Col de Peyresourde. Jan Ullrich reclaimed the yellow jersey, but lost 23 seconds to Marco Pantani, who went after eventual stage winner Rodolfo Massi on the last climb and came in second.

Stage 11
22 July 1998 — Luchon to Plateau de Beille, 

This stage was extremely mountainous, with the finish on the summit of Plateau de Beille. In sunny weather, Marco Pantani attacked late on the last climb, taking the stage and 1' 39" from Jan Ullrich. Team Cofidis put in an impressive performance, with four riders reaching the top ten of the stage.

References

Prologue To Stage 11
Tour de France stages